Rosters for the Ice hockey at the 2002 Winter Olympics in Salt Lake City, USA.

Austria 
Head coach:  Ron Kennedy

Assistant coach: Greg Holst

Belarus 
Head coach:  Vladimir Krikunov

Assistant coaches: Anatoli Belyayev,  Valeri Voronin

Canada 
Head coach: Pat Quinn

Assistant coaches: Wayne Fleming, Ken Hitchcock, Jacques Martin

Czech Republic 
Head coach: Josef Augusta

Assistant coaches: Vladimír Martinec, Vladimír Růžička

Finland 
Head coach: Hannu Aravirta

Assistant coaches: Jari Kurri, Esko Nokelainen

France 
Head coach:  Heikki Leime

Assistant coach:  Christer Eriksson

Germany 
Head coach: Hans Zach

Assistant coaches: Bernhard Englbrecht, Ernst Höfner

Latvia 
Head coach:  Curt Lindström

Assistant coach: Maris Baldonieks

Russia 
The following is the Russian roster for the men's ice hockey tournament at the 2002 Winter Olympics.

Head coach: Viacheslav Fetisov    
Assistant coaches: Vladislav Tretiak, Vladimir Yurzinov

Slovakia 
Head coach: Ján Filc

Assistant coach: Ernest Bokroš, Vladimír Šťastný

Sweden 
Head coach: Hardy Nilsson

Assistant coach: Mats Waltin

Switzerland 
Head coach: / Ralph Krueger

Assistant coach:  Bengt-Åke Gustafsson, Jakob Kölliker

Ukraine 
Head coach: Anatoli Bogdanov

Assistant coach: Oleksandr Seukand

United States 
Head coach: Herb Brooks

Assistant coach: John Cunniff, Lou Vairo

References

rosters

2002